Joseph Martin Reichard (23 September 180314 May 1872) was a German politician and revolutionary.  He was a lawyer by profession and a democrat by philosophy.  He was elected as a deputy to the Frankfurt National Assembly in 1848, and served as a member of the Provisional Government in the Palatinate during the uprising of 1849. He died in 1872.

1803 births
Place of birth unknown
1872 deaths
Place of death unknown
19th-century German lawyers
German revolutionaries
Members of the Frankfurt Parliament